The 1970 Australian Grand Prix was a motor race held at Warwick Farm Raceway in New South Wales, Australia on 22 November 1970. The race, which was the thirty fifth Australian Grand Prix, was open to Formula 5000 cars, 2.5-litre Australian Formula 1 cars and Australian Formula 2 cars. For the first time since 1956, the race was not a round of either the Australian Drivers' Championship or the Tasman Series.

Frank Matich started from pole position, won the race, his first Australian Grand Prix victory, and set the fastest race lap.

Classification 

Results as follows:

Qualifying

Race

Notes 
Pole position: Frank Matich - 1'23.9
Fastest lap: Frank Matich - 1'24.8

References

Grand Prix
Australian Grand Prix
Formula 5000 race reports
Motorsport at Warwick Farm
Australian Grand Prix